The Nissan Civilian (kana: 日産・シビリアン, Shibirian) is a single-decker minibus built by Japanese automaker Nissan since 1971. It is primarily available as a public bus and an intercity bus. In Japan, it was exclusive to Nissan Store locations, and replaced the Nissan Echo, which was introduced in 1958. The Echo's chassis code (GC140, GC240) continued to be used on the Civilian (GC340), reflecting their shared underpinnings with the Nissan Caball (C140/240/340).

In the Japan, Asia-Pacific, Middle East, Africa and South America markets, its principal competitors are the Mitsubishi Fuso Rosa, Isuzu Journey, Mazda Parkway and Toyota Coaster. In China, the Civilian is marketed by Dongfeng as the Dongfeng Green Lotus, but has Nissan logos.

Design

General information
The Nissan Civilian is sold under the Civilian and W41 or W 41 names. It is sold as the Civilian in Japan and several Central and South American countries. Its normal seating capacity is 26 passengers. Its main competitors are the Mitsubishi Fuso Rosa, Toyota Coaster, and Isuzu Journey, which significantly outnumber it in some countries.

Engines
TB45E: 4.5L Gasoline
TD42T: 4.2L Diesel Turbo
RD28T: 2.8L Diesel Turbo
ED33: 3.3 Diesel
ED33T 3.3 Diesel Turbo
ED35: 3.5L D
ZD30DDTi: 3.0l Diesel Turbo direct injection
Mitsubishi Fuso 4M50: 4.9l Diesel Turbo

Chassis codes

Earlier models

Originally introduced in 1958, the KC42 was a special-order vehicle built using B40 (Junior) and C40 (Caball) truck underpinnings. They were sold as the Nissan Junior Microbus and Caball Microbus respectively. In June 1960, reflecting model changes for the Junior and Caball (now B140 and C140), the Caball and Junior Microbuses were also updated and the GC140 Caball Microbus became a regularly available model. In 1961 the GC140 was renamed Caball Echo; the Junior-based buses seem to have been discontinued around this time. In 1962 the engine was changed to the 1.9-liter H engine and the name shortened to just "Echo." The chassis number was changed to GC141. In 1963 there was a light facelift, with higher mounted headlights and round rather than rectangular indicators. A long wheelbase model (GHC141) was also introduced. In January 1964 the SD22 diesel engine (GQC/GHQC141) joined the lineup. In November 1964 and October 1965 there were another two light facelifts; the second one also brought changes to the cooling system and the chassis code switched to 142.

GC240: Echo/Civilian, 1966-1976

In August 1966 the all-new GC240 replaced the earlier models, with more modern design with larger glass areas. Some visible parts were shared with the Caball, such as the headlight bezels. In October 1968 there were modifications inside and out, including a padded dashboard and large combination taillights. In April 1969 a twin rear-tire model was added, and a 1970 facelift brought headlights integrated with the grille and headrests for all seats. After a series of high publicity accidents involving failing propshafts, followed by a hearing in the Diet, Nissan developed a two-piece propshaft. Nonetheless, the "Echo" name had received bad connotations and in September 1971 the C240 Echo was renamed "Civilian." Engines remained the 2-liter H20 petrol unit and the SD22 diesel. In January 1973 the 3-litre ED30 diesel engine became available, in order to better handle the added power needs of air conditioning.

GC340: 1976-1982

This took over from the GC240 Nissan Civilian in May 1976. The Prince Light Coach model (a competing line which had been sold through Prince retail stores) was discontinued and folded into the Civilian line. The GC340's chassis is closely related to the C340 Caball. In August 1978 the emissions controls were updated to meet new regulations; the chassis codes were accordingly changed to "341."

W40: 1982-1999
M-UW40: 1982-1988
N-MGW40/MW40: 1982-1990
P-FGW40/FW40/VUSW40: 1984-1988
U-RGW40/RYW40: 1988- 
U-BGW40/BW40: 1990- 
U-RAW40: 1993- 
Models vary from Roof Style, A/C Option, and Wheelbase

W41: 1999-2021 
KK-BCW41/BHW41/BJW41/BVW41: 1999-2004
PA-ACW41/AHW41/AJW41/AVW41: 2004-2007
PA-DCW41/DHW41/DJW41/DVW41: 2004- 
Models vary from Suspension, Engine, and Wheelbase

Famous users
Ousted Panama dictator Manuel Noriega, in his reign, had at least one Nissan Civilian as his personal transport. It was a luxury, fully furnished version with amenities such as TV, restroom and kitchenette. This Civilian is now said to be owned by a Panamanian national who obtained it in very bad condition and restored it.

See also

 List of buses

References

External links

Nissan Civilian Official Homepage
NCSOL Bus Release "Nissan Civilian"

Buses of Japan
Minibuses
Police vehicles
Cab over vehicles
Civilian
Vehicles introduced in 1971